The Kudzu DG-2 is an IMSA GTP Lights sports prototype race car, designed, developed and built by American racing driver Jim Downing, to compete in sports car racing, between 1992 and 1999. It debuted at the 1992 12 Hours of Sebring. Its best result was a third-place race finish, and it achieved ten class wins. It was powered by a naturally-aspirated  Buick V6 engine. Only 3 models were manufactured and produced.

References

Sports prototypes
IMSA GTP cars